Darcy Megan Stanger (born June 19, 1971, Caldwell, Idaho), better known by the pen name Dame Darcy, is an alternative cartoonist, fine artist, musician, cabaret performer, and animator/filmmaker. Her "Neo-Victorian" comic book series Meat Cake was published by Fantagraphics Books from 1993–2008. The Meat Cake Bible compilation was released in June 2016 and nominated for The Eisner Award July 2017. Vegan Love: Dating and Partnering for the Cruelty-Free Gal, with Fashion, Makeup & Wedding Tips, written by Maya Gottfried and illustrated by Dame Darcy, was the Silver Medalist winners of the Independent Publisher Book Awards in 2018. 

Her self-published Tarot decks went viral world wide in 2012 with a second wave in 2018 for the Dame Darcy Mermaid Tarot Gold Edition deck and Queen Alice Tarot deck and were listed as Etsy Bestsellers in 2018. Dame Darcy's autobiographical graphic novel, Hi Jax & Hi Jinx (Life's a Pitch and Then You Live Forever), was published by Feral House in 2019  Other graphic novels include Handbook for Hot Witches, The Illustrated Jane Eyre, Frightful Fairytales, Gasoline, and Dollerium.

She worked with writer Alan Moore and for such publishers as America's Best Comics, DC Comics, Image Comics, Kitchen Sink Press, Starhead Comix, Penguin Putnam, PressPop Tokyo, Merrell, Henry Holt and Company, and Seven Stories Press. Dame Darcy published about 100 books internationally, with her comics being translated into Japanese, French, Spanish, and Portuguese, among others. Her films and animation won awards and have been shown internationally. Her fine art and dolls were exhibited and sold in art galleries globally for more than 20 years. In the late 1990s director Lisa Hammer and Dame Darcy produced a variety TV show titled Turn Of The Century profiling their short "silent film" style movies for Manhattan public access, which are now part of the Getty Museum Collection.

Biography 
Dame Darcy acquired her initial skill set while still a child and teen working as an apprentice to her father in his sign-painting studio, Green Tree Graphics. She began her own career at age 17 when she won a scholarship to the San Francisco Art Institute. During this time, she acted in films by George Kuchar.

She made her first publishing deal at the age of 21 when her comic book series Meat Cake was picked up by Fantagraphics Books. She originally considered using the pen name "Richard Dirt" but her father suggested adding a title to her own first name instead, so Darcy used the name Richard Dirt as a character in her comic book.

She performed for a time with Lisa Crystal Carver and Jean-Louis Costes's underground cabaret Suckdog Circus. SUCKDOG Reunion Tour 2016, a documentary concert film starring Lisa Carver (Lisa Suckdog) as "The Dish" and Dame Darcy as "Ghost Mother" is currently available as a DVD.

Her latest books as of 2016 are Lady Killers (Harper Collins), The Jaywalker, with Lisa Carver,  Lucky, and other compilations. Dame Darcy's autobiography, Hi Jax & Hi Jinx, was published by Feral House in 2019, and has a feature film screenplay attached.  Her self-published Mermaid Tarot and Queen Alice tarot card decks are independently distributed.

She has illustrated for fashion designers Anna Sui and Gothic Lolita designers CWC, Baby Doll, Ku, Coi Girl Magic and Jared Gold while working as a runway model in NYC and LA.

In the 1990s, Dame Darcy made a doll for Courtney Love which included hair from the late Kurt Cobain. The doll was a gift to Love's daughter Frances Bean Cobain. Dame Darcy planned to auction some of Kurt Cobain's leftover hair in 2015 but withdrew it following a complaint from Love.

Her teaching experience varies among all ages and contexts. Dame Darcy taught an independent comics publishing course at the School of Visual Arts in Manhattan, as well as lecturing and workshops at Columbia University, and in Europe and Japan.

Bibliography

Comics/graphic novels 
 Dame Darcy's Witchy Cat Tarot (2021)
 Musings And Meanings - Scrapbook style tarot meanings book based on Ryder Waite Smith with journal and creative writing prompts (2021)
 X (10) The 10th Annual Anniversary Comic Compilation from the Montreal Comic Festival PRESSES DU FBDM / MCAF PRESS book series Lettres à Montreal (2021) 
 Library of Esoterica Tarot- Dame Darcy Mermaid Tarot cards included in this Taschen anthology (2020) 
 Scorched Earth - Post Apocalyptic Graphic Novel Published by Paper Movies (2020) - by Janet Montgomery and Erik Olsen, writers: Dame Darcy, Shane Riches, illustrated by : Daniele Nicotra 
 Hi Jax & Hi Jinx — Dame Darcy's autobiography graphic novel (Feral House, 2019) 
 Dame Darcy's Mermaid Tarot (2012–present)
 Dame Darcy's Queen Alice Tarot (2018–present)
 Lady Killers (HarperCollins, 2017) — illustrations for a novel by Tori Telfer
 Mirror Mirror (2d Cloud, 2017) — comics anthology edited by Sean T. Collins and Julia Gfrörer
 Vegan Love: Dating and Partnering for the Cruelty-Free Gal, with Fashion, Makeup & Wedding Tips (Skyhorse Publishing, 2017) — illustrations for a book by Maya Gottfried 
 Lisa Carver's Jaywalker (Suckdog, 2016) — illustrations for a book by Lisa Carver
 The Meat Cake Bible (Fantagraphics Books, July 2016) —  every story from all 17 issues of Meat Cake (1993–2008), as well as new stories from the unpublished 18th issue; over 400 pages of comics
 Tarzan and the Comics of Idaho #1 (Idaho Comics Group, August 2014)
 Handbook for Hot Witches (Henry Holt and Company, Oct. 2012)
 Alice's Adventures in Wonderland and The Tell-Tale Heart, in The Graphic Canon Vol. 1, Vol. 2, and Vol. 3 (2012-2016): The Definitive Anthology of the World's Greatest Literature Through Comics Vol. 2 (Seven Stories Press, October 2012)Vol. 3 hit the New York Times Bestseller List for Graphic Books, and rights sold for foreign editions to publishers around the world. 
 Women of Marvel #2 ("Fantastic Four (Fairy-Tales)") (Marvel Comics, December 2010)
 Gasoline (Merrell Books, 2008)
 Comic Book Tattoo (Image Comics, 2008) — anthology of comics based on Tori Amos songs, with a foreword by Neil Gaiman.
 Meat Cake #1-17 (Fantagraphics Books, 1993–2008)
 Dollerium (Press Pop, 2007) — full color book /DVD
 The Illustrated Jane Eyre (Penguin Putnam, 2006)
 Dame Darcy's Meat Cake Compilation (Fantagraphics Books, 2003; reprint edition, 2010);  — collects material from the first decade of Meat Cake; includes "Hungry is the Heart," a collaboration between Dame Darcy and Alan Moore
 Frightful Fairy Tales (Ten Speed Press, 2002)
 Tomorrow Stories #9–10 and America's Best Comics Special #1 (DC Comics/America's Best Comics, 2001) — illustrating Cobweb stories by Alan Moore
 Spin The Bottle (2007) — Illustrations for graphic novel by Justine Brown
 In The Garden of Poisonous Flowers (Subterranean Press, 2002) — Illustrations for graphic novel
 Lost Souls (Delacorte Press, 1999) — illustrations for graphic novel by Poppy Z. Brite
 The Big Book Of Grimm (DC Comics/Paradox Press, 1999)
 Media Vaca (2002) — Spanish comics compilation
 A Girl's Guide to Taking Over the World (St. Martin's Press, 1998)
 Bust Magazine Book (1999) — contributor 
 Suture (1999) — contributor to a London-based journal
 Women's Herstory in Comics, compiled and edited by Trina Robbins (1998) — comics compilation featuring female cartoonists
 Twisted Sisters vol. 2: Drawing the Line (Kitchen Sink Press, 1995) — anthology of female cartoonists
 Diva (1992) — anthology of female cartoonists

Illustration 
 The Penalty of Hope: Poems, by Vincent D. Dominion (2010)
 Blythe (CWC, 2006) — doll book produced by Hasbro, featuring the fashion doll Blythe
 Dancing Queen, by Lisa Carver (Henry Holt, 1998)
 Rollerderby: the Book, by Lisa Carver (Feral House, 1996) 
 Doll House Book (Finnegan, 2000) — doll designs
 Funeral Party I and Funeral Party II, by Shade Rupe (1995-1999)
 Broken Noses and Metempsychoses, by Michael Carter (1998)
 In the Garden of Poisonous Flowers, by Caitlín R. Kiernan (2002)
 Hasbro My Little Pony Doll Design
 Jane Magazine Illustrations for Astrology Section
 Meat Cake, self‐published comic series #1‐3
 Meat Cake, issue #0, Iconographics Publications
 Star Head Mini Comix
 Index Mag, Dame Darcy interviews Cindy Sherman and others
 Rollerderby, Regular Contributor
 New York Press
 Village Voice
 Purr, published in U.K.
 Bananafish mag
 Pretty Decorating mag
 Hermenaut mag
 C.M.J. Catalogue
 Her mag Staff Artist
 Last Gasp catalog, cover
 The Stranger
 Bust mag
 Bitch mag
 Venus mag
 Stim, online publication
 Tango Palace, record cover
 Kittywinder record cover
 Boss Hog record cover
 Paper Mag comics and Guestroom with a view Planet Blue animation
 Word Online Publication,Toozeday Comics Regular Contributor
 C.H.E.W. Lollapalooza catalog, illustration for Courtney Love
 Pulse mag
 Dolls mag
 Vice mag
 Wired mag
 Hate comic Peter Bagge Regular Contributor
 Seattle Weekly
 Alice mag UK
 L.A. Weekly Pulpit full‐page color comics
 Visionaire Fashion Magazine, 2001‐2002, Fashion Illustration, (N.Y.‐based)
 Jelouse Fashion Magazine, 2002, (French based)
 MOCA LA Designs for Christmas cards

Discography 
 Caroliner Rainbow, 1989-1992 2nd, 3rd, and 4th albums
 "Are You Afraid to Die" (Nuff Sed Records, 1992) — cassette with individually hand-tinted limited edition book with lyrics and illustrations
 "Mexican Crawling Poppy Seed" 7" (Nuff Sed Records, 1993)
 "The Devil Made Her Do It" 7" (Stick Shift Records, 1993)
 (Dame Darcy with The Coctails) "Tardvark" 7" (High Ball Records, 1994)
 compilation CD (Sideshow Records, 1994)
 Kill Rock Stars (1994) — compilation CD
 (Dame Darcy & Dennis Driscoll) EP (Little Pad Records, 1995)
 "Will O' Wisp Octopus" 7" (Villa VillaKula Records, 1995)
 "When I'm Hungry I Eat" (Gormandizer Records) — compilation CD
 "Grouse Mountain Skyride" 7" (1996)
 (Suckdog) Onward Suckdog Soldiers (Suckdog, 1998)
 Isabelle the Hungriest Filly (1998)
 (Black Strap Molasses Family) "The Elixir That'll Fix'er" (Transparency Records, 1998)
 Rock Rock Chicken Pox (1999)
"My Eyes Have Seen the Glory" (CT Records, 2002)
 "Gem In Eye" 7" (ir-ar Records U.K., 2002)
 Dame Darcy's Greatest Hits Vol. 1 (Boptart/Action Driver Records, 2004)
 (Death By Doll) Gasoline (Emperor Penguin Recordings, 2006)
 Horse Hospital (Infinite Chug Records, 2008)
 (Death By Doll) Cabin Fever (Emperor Penguin Recordings, 2008)
 (Death By Doll) ElectroRococo (February 2019)

Fine Art Exhibitions
 Nicolas Ballet profiling Lisa Hammer and Dame Darcy's surrealist short film Elaborate Empire Of Ache in Paris - L'Empire de la douleur. Le surrealism noir de Johanna Went et de Dame Darcy. Museum of Strasbourg 2022
 McMullen Museum in Boston - alternative comics exhibit from Sept.-Dec. 2022, raw comics weirdo and beyond - Dame Darcy's Meat Cake issue 2 1994 published by Fantagraphics
 Bust Magazine Group show for contributors DD original comics 2013
 Solo Show Smart Clothes Gallery NYC 2012
 Bert Green Fine Art Chicago 2012
 Dame Darcy is currently represented by Sloan Fine Art NYC
 Pony Show gallery 2009
 Meyer Gallery Zurich Switzerland Gasoline solo exhibit 2009
 Civilian Art Projects Washington DC Gasoline exhibit 2009
 Claire Obscura Gallery LA Gasoline exhibit 2008
 Bert Green Fine Art LA solo Gasoline exhibit 2008
 Sloan Fine Art solo Gasoline exhibit 2008
 Show Cave Gallery LA solo exhibit 2008
 Gallery Le Le Tokyo 2007
 Regent Gallery Group show LA 2007
 Hyena Gallery solo show LA 2007
 Black Chandelier Gallery LA 2007
 Museum of Contemporary Comics NY 2007
 Maude Carrin, LA, CA, 2007
 Eagle Rock Museum Idaho 2006
 Kunsthaus Museum exhibition + performance with Gelitin Bregens Austria 2006
 Comics Art Museum NY 2006
 Galleria Italia Italy 2006
 Milk Gallery NY 2005
 Copro‐Nasson group show Burgamot Station Santa Monica 2005
 Richard Heller Solo Show Burgamot Station 2005
 Claire Obscura Gallery LA 2005
 Bellwether Gallery, NY, NY, 2004
 Putnam Art Center, Pelham, NY, 2004
 City Of Women Music /Art Festival, solo show, Lubliana Slovenia, 2003
 Comics Art Gallery SF 2003
 Richard Heller Gallery, Solo Show, Santa Monica, CA, 2002
 Pond Gallery, San Francisco, CA, 2002
 Press Pop Gallery, Tokyo, Japan, 2001
 Doll Exhibit, curated by Marcelle DuJour, LA, CA, 2001
 Down Town Gallery, LA, CA, 2001
 Show Pony, Solo Show, LA, CA, 2001
 Multimedia Events including illustrations, performance, dolls, films, animation staged in galleries in Holland and Berlin, Aug. 1999
 Artcite Gallery, Ontario, Canada, 1/99
 B‐Bar Gallery, NY, NY, 4/99
 Animazing Gallery, NY, NY, 5/98
 Tribes Gallery, NY, NY, 6/98
 Jorgensen Gallery, NY, NY, 7/98
 Cedar Tavern (Women In Animation Group Show), NY, NY, 7/98
 Max Fish Gallery, NY, NY, 11/94, 11/95, 11/96, 11/97, 11/98
 Spaces Gallery, Cleveland, OH, 10/95
 White Columns Gallery, NY, NY, 11/95
 Allegheny College, Meadville, PA, 1996
 Center on Contemporary Art (COCA), Seattle, WA, 1/96, 11/99
 Thread Waxing Space, NY, NY, 5/96
 Round Up Gallery, NY, NY, 12/96
 Lost Engine Gallery, Allston, MA, 11/95
 Exit Art Gallery, 9/93, 12/95
 CBGB Gallery, NY, NY, 7/94, 7/95, 7/96

Clothes design / Fashion illustration 
 Anna Sui ‐ (T‐shirt illustration)
 Baby Doll ‐ (Tokyo‐based Gothic Lolita fashion)
 Coi‐Girl Magic ‐ (Tokyo‐based Gothic Lolita fashion)
 CWC ‐ (Tokyo‐based doll fashion for Blythe)
 Jared Gold ‐ (Illustrated designs)
 KU/Baby Doll ‐ Dame Darcy Designs for Tokyo‐based fashion label, also affiliated with
 LaForet (Tokyo‐based)
 All other design for clothes one of a kind fashion sold /distributed Dame Darcy

Interior design
 Margaret Cho ‐ Custom stained‐glass doors depicting Meat Cake characters
 Courtney Love ‐ Border‐paintings for Courtney Love's home
 Courtney Love designs for promotional tour
 The Parlour Club ‐ West Hollywood Club interior design and sign
 Amoeba Music Store ‐ Window Display
 Out Fest ‐ Installations

Record cover design
 Miss Murgatroid, record cover
 Tango Palace, record cover
 Kittywinder, record cover
 Boss Hog, record cover
 Agent Ribbons, record cover
 Songs From An Attic, record Cover
 Scotty Karate, record Cover
 Phalocracy, record cover
 Death By Doll, record cover

Animation
 Duchess and Doppelganger, Cell animation vignette. Animation and artwork by Dame Darcy, 12/95.
 Turn of the Century, title sequence for Dame Darcy public access television, program.
 Art design and music by Dame Darcy, computer animation by Chris Kirella, 1996.
 Golden Shoes, computer animated vignette. Animation and artwork by Dame Darcy. Animated by Adam Gravois. Toured with LowRes Festival, 4/96 and won First Prize for Experimental Animation at the New York Animation Festival, 1999. Presented by Mark Mothersbaugh of DEVO.
 The Victorians, animated segue for PBS special, art and design by Dame Darcy. Computer animation by Adam Gravois, 5/96.
 MTV Station Identification, art, design and music by Dame Darcy, 7/96. Computer animation by Eric Calderone.
 Mistakes, vignette for Cartoon Network, art design by Dame Darcy. Storyboard by Mike Bade and stop motion animation by Ben Goldman, 7/97.
 Paper Doll Fun, computer animated paper doll game. Art and music by Dame Darcy, Animation by Daron Murphy, 1997.
 Planet Blue, Paper Online. Serialized installments of a partially animated comic, based on the screenplay for the feature film of the same name, 1999‐2000.
 Apple Blossom Time, short animated film with Lisa Barnstone 2000.
 Jim! Press Pop animation release Tokyo 2005.
 Rasputina Video 2007.
 Gasoline animation with Corey Michael Simthson 2008.
 Paper Doll On line Animation for Dame Darcy.com 2010.
ACTING & PERFORMANCE
 Independent Films by George Kuchar, San Francisco, CA, 1989‐1991
 Caroliner Rainbow, played banjo and recorded four albums & tour between 1989‐91.
 Suckdog, performance troupe, national tours, 1992 and 1998.
 Check Out Time, starred in independent feature film directed by Scott Hamrah, 1993.
 America's Best Eye Glasses, voice over for an animated television commercial directed by M. Henry Jones, 1995.
 Kitty Winder, acted in and designed sets for rock videos, 1995.
 Dame Darcy Plays, starred in short film directed by E. Steven Fried, 1995. GenArt Film Festival Benefit.
 Turn of the Century, hosts and produces cable access television show on Manhattan neighborhood network, 1996‐Present.
 Risque Reverie, starred in short film directed by E. Steven Fried, 1996.
 The Hamptons International Film Festival, NY 1996
 The Lower East Side Film Festival, NY 1996
 Louisville Film & Video Festival, KY 1997
 The GenArt Film Festival Benefit, NY 1997
 Wilmington Exchange Festival, 1997
 The Atlanta Film & Video Festival, 1998
 Candela Film Festival. 1998
 Elaborate Empire of Ache, starred in short film directed by Lisa Hammer, 1996
 Chicago Film Festival, 1997
 New York Underground Film Festival, 1998
 European tour with Drift Distribution, 1997‐1998.
 Rest In Peace, starred in an independent short film directed by Rachel Amedeo, 1997.
 Dance of Death, starred and wrote independent short film, 1997.
 New York Underground Film Festival, 1999.
 Autohypnomania, starred in independent short film directed by Alexande Hazeltine, 1998.
 Black Strap Molasses Family ‐ Appalachian Folk Band, 1998‐2000.
 Silly Sauce, starred in independent short film directed by Marcel Dejure 1999
 Cards With Cards ‐ starred and wrote independent short film, 1999.
 Angels of Light ‐ Michael Gira project music tour 1999.
 Centemeters Music Video by Charles Schneider, 2001.
 CABARET Acts, 1998 ‐ Present, at the following venues in New York City: Deep Dish, Slipper Room, Shrine, Red Vixen, Blue Angel.
 EZ Bake Coven Cabaret ‐ (Olympia, WA), 2000.
 San Francisco Lady Fest, 2002.
 AYE AYE CAPTAIN ‐ Sea shanty folk/rock band, L.A.‐based, 2001‐2003.
 Cabin Fever, Sea shanty folk/rock band, L.A.‐based, 2003‐2004.
 Toured with Nora Keyes in USA, Mar. 2003 Fever Performance in Slovenia at the City of Women Festival, 2002.
 Suckdog Tour ‐ Performance/music US tour 2005.
 Death By Doll ‐ Lady Fest Olympia, 2005.
 Rasputina ‐ US music tour, 2005.
 Death By Doll / Jane Eyre national book/music promotional US tour, 2006.
 The Love Show ‐ Cabaret CIA LA, 2006
 Gasoline graphic novel / Death By Doll CD national release promotional tour 2008
 Naughty Nautical Nite Cabaret Hosted at the Slipper Room by Dame Darcy/ Jessica Delfino 2008

Further reading 
 Dark Stars Rising, by Shade Rupe — 24 years of interviews with various creators of darker art (Headpress, 2010)
 A Conversation With Dame Darcy, By Ron Rege "Dame Darcy's Meat Cake was one of the most culturally visible alternative comic book titles of the 1990s."  (The Comics Journal, 2016)

References

External links

 Radio interview about Meat Cake Bible with Dame Darcy and Mark Lynch, 2016

1971 births
20th-century American artists
21st-century American artists
Album-cover and concert-poster artists
Alternative cartoonists
American comics writers
American female comics artists
Artists from Idaho
Dollmakers
Female comics writers
Living people
Musicians from Idaho
People from Caldwell, Idaho
San Francisco Art Institute alumni
Underground cartoonists